Diana Taylor (born 1950) is an American academic. She is a professor of Performance Studies and Spanish at New York University' s Tisch School of the Arts and the founding director of the Hemispheric Institute of Performance and Politics. She is also the president of the Modern Language Association (MLA) in 2017-2018. Her work focuses on Latin American and U.S. theatre and performance, performance and politics, feminist theatre and performance in the Americas, Hemispheric studies,  and trauma studies.  She is married to Eric Manheimer, former New York Bellevue Hospital medical director and current producer of the NBC television show New Amsterdam.

Early life
Taylor graduated from the Universidad de las Américas, A.C. in Mexico, where she earned a bachelor of arts degree in creative writing in 1971, and another degree from Aix-Marseille University in France. She earned a master's degree from the National Autonomous University of Mexico in 1974 and a PhD from the University of Washington in 1981, both of which in comparative literature.

Career
Taylor taught at Dartmouth College from 1982 to 1997. She is a professor of Performance Studies and Spanish at New York University' s Tisch School of the Arts. She is also the founding director of  the Hemispheric Institute of Performance and Politics. She became the second vice president of the Modern Language Association in December 2014. She served as its president from January 2017 to January 2018.

Taylor received a Guggenheim Fellowship in 2005. She won the Best Book Award by New England Council on Latin American Studies for Theatre of Crisis, and the Outstanding Book award from the Association of Theatre in Higher Education and the Kathleen Singer Kovaks Award from the Modern Language Association (MLA) for The Archive and the Repertoire.

Works

As an author
 ¡Presente! The Politics of Presence
 The Archive and the Repertoire: Performing Cultural Memory in the Americas
 Theatre of Crisis: Drama and Politics in Latin America
 Disappearing Acts: Spectacles of Gender and Nationalism in Argentina's 'Dirty War'''

As an editorHoly Terrors: Latin American Women PerformDefiant Acts: Four Plays by Diana RaznovichNegotiating Performance in Latin/o America: Gender, Sexuality and TheatricalityThe Politics of Motherhood: Activists from Left to Right''.

References

Living people
National Autonomous University of Mexico alumni
Aix-Marseille University alumni
University of Washington alumni
Dartmouth College faculty
New York University faculty
Latin Americanists
1950 births
Presidents of the Modern Language Association